Eddy is an unincorporated community in Marshall County, Alabama, United States. Eddy was most likely named for a local resident. A post office operated under the name Eddy from 1894 to 1907.

References

Unincorporated communities in Marshall County, Alabama
Unincorporated communities in Alabama